The Land Ports Authority of India or LPAI is a statutory body (created through the Land Ports Authority of India Act, 2010) working under the Ministry of Home Affairs, Government of India is responsible for creating, upgrading, maintaining and managing border infrastructure in India. It managess several Integrated Check Posts (ICPs) all across Borders of India.

History
LPAI was setup by Land Ports Authority of India Act, 2010 of Parliament of India on 1 March 2012.

Projects 
Integrated Check Posts (ICPs)
Inland Custom Posts
Shri Kartarpur Sahib Corridor

References

External links

Border crossings of India
Borders of India
Immigration to India
Ministry of Home Affairs (India)